USS Caroline County (LST-525) was an  built for the United States Navy during World War II. Named for counties in Maryland and Virginia, she was the only U.S. Naval vessel to bear the name.

LST-525 was laid down on 18 October 1943 at Jeffersonville, Indiana by the Jeffersonville Boat & Machine Company; launched on 20 December 1943; sponsored by Mrs. Anna Mae Federspiel; and commissioned on 14 February 1944.

Service history

During World War II, LST-525 was assigned to the European Theater and participated in the following operations: Convoy UGS-36 (April 1944) and the invasion of southern France (August and September 1944). Following the war, LST-525 was decommissioned on 25 June 1946.

She was recommissioned in October, 1950 and performed services for the Amphibious Force, U.S. Atlantic Fleet, until decommissioned on 15 September 1954. On 1 July 1955 she was named USS Caroline County (LST-525).

Again reactivated in mid-1965, Caroline County provided support and resupply for riverine forces in Vietnam in 1967 and 1968. Decommissioned in early 1970 at Orange, Texas she was struck from the Naval Vessel Register on 15 September 1974. Caroline County was sold for scrapping by the Defense Reutilization and Marketing Service (DRMS) 1 August 1975.
 
Caroline County earned two battle stars for World War II service as LST-525 and four battle stars for Vietnam War service.

References

See also
 List of United States Navy LSTs
 Caroline County, Maryland
 Caroline County, Virginia

LST-491-class tank landing ships
World War II amphibious warfare vessels of the United States
Cold War amphibious warfare vessels of the United States
Vietnam War amphibious warfare vessels of the United States
Caroline County, Maryland
Caroline County, Virginia
Ships built in Jeffersonville, Indiana
1943 ships